Renzo Iván Tesuri (born 7 June 1996) is an Argentine professional footballer who plays as a right winger for Atlético Tucumán.

Career
Juventud Unida were Tesuri's first club. He made his professional debut at the age of seventeen, playing the last ten minutes of a Torneo Argentino A defeat to Central Norte on 24 November 2013. His next appearance arrived in June 2016 against Independiente Rivadavia in Primera B Nacional, after the club won promotion in 2014. He scored his first goal during a fixture with Los Andes on 13 November, which was the first of five in the 2016–17 season; two coming in a win over Douglas Haig on 19 March 2017. Five months later, in August, Tesuri joined fellow second tier team Gimnasia y Esgrima. He featured twenty-four times.

On 19 June 2018, Tesuri was signed by Ferro Carril Oeste. He netted his opening goal in his second appearance versus Guillermo Brown on 1 September.

Career statistics
.

References

External links

1996 births
Living people
Place of birth missing (living people)
Argentine footballers
Association football wingers
Torneo Argentino A players
Primera Nacional players
Juventud Unida de Gualeguaychú players
Gimnasia y Esgrima de Jujuy footballers
Ferro Carril Oeste footballers
Godoy Cruz Antonio Tomba footballers
Atlético Tucumán footballers
Sportspeople from Entre Ríos Province